Brayan Alfredo Guevara Uchofen (born 5 May 1998) is a Peruvian footballer who plays as a left winger for Alianza Universidad.

Career

Club career
Guevara made his professional debut for Comerciantes Unidos at the age of 18 on 20 October 2016. He started on the bench, before replacing Marvin Rios in the 70th minute. Only 8 minutes later, he scored his first goal for the club. He played 31 league games for the club between 2016 and 2017, before he joined UTC Cajamarca.

On 31 December 2019, FC Carlos Stein confirmed the signing of Guevara. He left the club at the end of 2020.

On 16 February 2021, Guevara joined Peruvian Segunda División club Unión Huaral. A year later, on 6 January 2022, Guevara moved to Alianza Universidad.

References

External links
 
 

Living people
1998 births
Association football wingers
Peruvian footballers
Peruvian Primera División players
Comerciantes Unidos footballers
Universidad Técnica de Cajamarca footballers
FC Carlos Stein players
Unión Huaral footballers
Alianza Universidad footballers
People from Chiclayo